Emily D. Seeton, also known as Miss Seeton or MissEss, is the fictional heroine of a series of British cosy mystery novels by Heron Carvic, Roy Peter Martin writing as Hampton Charles, and Sarah J. Mason writing as Hamilton Crane.  Cosy Mysteries lists the books as the "Retired British Art Teacher in England Series".

Miss Seeton inadvertently draws psychologically and, perhaps, psychically informative sketches that allow Inspector Delphick and his assistant Bob Ranger to solve the crime.  The primary plot element is Miss Seeton finding herself in an awkward situation as a result of logical and ladylike actions.

Bibliography

Heron Carvic
Picture Miss Seeton (1968). The 1968 US (Harper & Row) edition of Picture Miss Seeton contains characters and scenes not included in the 1968 UK (Geoffrey Bles) edition.  Subsequent reissues have used the Geoffrey Bles text.
Miss Seeton Draws the Line (1969)
Witch Miss Seeton  (1971) (UK title Miss Seeton, Bewitched)
Miss Seeton Sings  (1973)
Odds on Miss Seeton (1975)

Roy Peter Martin writing as Hampton Charles
Miss Seeton, by Appointment (1990)
Advantage Miss Seeton (1990) 
Miss Seeton at the Helm (1990)

Sarah J. Mason writing as Hamilton Crane
Miss Seeton Cracks the Case (1991)
Miss Seeton Paints the Town (1991)
Miss Seeton Rocks the Cradle (1992)
Hands Up, Miss Seeton (1992)
Miss Seeton by Moonlight (1992)
Miss Seeton Plants Suspicion (1993)
Miss Seeton Goes to Bat (1993)
Starring Miss Seeton (1994)
Miss Seeton Undercover (1994)
Miss Seeton Rules (1994)
Sold to Miss Seeton (1995)
Sweet Miss Seeton (1996)
Bonjour, Miss Seeton (1997)
Miss Seeton's Finest Hour (1999)
Miss Seeton Quilts the Village (2017)
Miss Seeton Flies High (2018)

References

External links
 Cosy Mystery blog - Why three authors
 At Fantastic Fiction

Further reading
 Victoria Nichols, Susan Thompson, "Silk stalkings: more women write of murder", Scarecrow Press, 1998, page 277

Characters in British novels of the 20th century
Literary characters introduced in 1968
Miss Seeton
Fictional amateur detectives